Wes Long (born August 13, 1977) is an American politician who served in the Alabama House of Representatives from the 27th district from 2010 to 2014.

References

1977 births
Living people
Republican Party members of the Alabama House of Representatives